Almirante Schroeders Airport is a military airport on the northern point of Isla Dawson, an island midway through the Strait of Magellan in the Magallanes y Antártica Chilena Region of Chile.

The crossing runways are just inland from the island's eastern shore, and approach and departures are over the water.

See also

Transport in Chile
List of airports in Chile

References

External links
OpenStreetMap - Almirante Schoeders
OurAirports - Almirante Schoeders
SkyVector - Almirante Schoeders
FallingRain - Almirante Schoeders Airport

Airports in Magallanes Region